Slåtterøy Lighthouse is a coastal lighthouse located in the municipality of Bømlo in southwestern Vestland county (previously Hordaland county), Norway. It sits at the western entrance to the Selbjørnsfjorden, marking an island-filled area northeast of Bømlo and northwest of Stord.

History
The lighthouse was established in 1859 and fully automated in 2003. The  round, cast iron tower is painted red with one white horizontal band. At the top, there is a light that emits a 5,180,000 candela, the highest intensity among all lighthouses in Norway.

The lighthouse was listed as a protected site in 2000 and in 2003 it was fully automated.  The ownership of the site was then transferred to the municipal government.  Overnight accommodations are available, as are guided tours.  The site is only accessible by boat from the nearby island of Gisøy.

See also

Lighthouses in Norway
List of lighthouses in Norway

References

External links

 Norsk Fyrhistorisk Forening 

Bømlo
Lighthouses completed in 1859
Lighthouses in Vestland
Listed lighthouses in Norway